Echoes is singer-songwriter Livingston Taylor's fifth album, released in 1979. The album is a "greatest hits" sampler of songs from Taylor's first three albums.

Track listing
All tracks composed by Livingston Taylor; except where indicated
 "Get Out of Bed" – 2:49
 "On Broadway" (Barry Mann, Cynthia Weil, Jerry Leiber, Mike Stoller) – 3:37
 "Carolina Day" – 3:08
 "Lady Tomorrow" – 2:41
 "Caroline" – 2:16
 "Lost in the Love of You" – 3:00
 "Loving Be My New Horizon" – 1:45
 "Can't Get Back Home" – 2:25
 "Gentleman" – 3:14
 "Over the Rainbow" (Harold Arlen, E.Y. Harburg) – 2:41
 "If I Needed Someone" (George Harrison) – 2:56
 "Hush a Bye" – 2:38

Personnel
Livingston Taylor – guitar, keyboards, vocals

References

1979 greatest hits albums
Livingston Taylor albums
Capricorn Records compilation albums